The Ruby Tear is a 1997 novel by award winning American author Suzy McKee Charnas writing as Rebecca Brand.

References

1997 American novels